Krista Piirimäe (born Krista Hiiemets on 5 April 1946 in Tallinn) is an Estonian art historian.

In 1970 she graduated from the University of Tartu. Since 1970 she is working at Tartu Art Museum.

Her spouse was historian Helmut Piirimäe.

Works

 Professor Aleksander Vardi looming aastail 1961–1971 (catalogue). Tartu 1972
 Väliskunstinäitused Eestis aastail 1920–1940. // TKM-i kogude teatmik. Tartu 1985
 Tartu Riiklik Kunstiinstituut 1950. aastal. // TÜ ajaloo küsimusi XXV (1991)
 Eesti kunstinäitus Pariisis 1929. a. // Looming (1995) 2
 Tartu Kunstimuuseumi asutamine stalinistliku kultuuripoliitika taustal. // Muuseum 10 (2001) 1
 Aleksander Vardi dekoraatorina Pärnus ja Tartus. // TMK (2001) 8–9
 100 aastat Voldemar Ermi sünnist. // Muuseum 18 (2005) 2

References

Living people
1946 births
Estonian educators
Women educators
Estonian art historians
Estonian women historians
University of Tartu alumni
Writers from Tallinn
People from Tallinn